Stephen or Steven May may refer to:

Stevie May (born 1992), Scottish professional footballer
Stephen May (politician) (1931–2016), American lawyer, mayor of Rochester and member of the Reagan administration
Steven May (born 1992), Australian rules footballer
Steve May, member of the Arizona House of Representatives
Steven W. May, specialist in Renaissance poetry
Stephen May (novelist) (born 1964), British novelist